Paddock Grand Prix was a Grand Prix motorcycle racing team from Switzerland who competed in the F.I.M. Road Racing World Championship since  until , before being acquired by team Technomag. In , Paddock's rider Thomas Lüthi won the 125cc title.

History
The team began racing as Elit Grand Prix in the  season with Czech rider Jakub Smrž on a Honda RS125R. 

At the 2005 French Grand Prix the Paddock team achieved its first victory thanks to Thomas Lüthi who won the 125cc race. At the end of the season he secured the world championship title in the 125cc class.
In the  season the team, known as Emmi - Caffè Latte Racing Team, switched to Aprilia bikes with rider Sandro Cortese on an Aprilia RS 125 R in the 125 class and Thomas Lüthi on an Aprilia RSV 250 in the 250 division.

For the  season, the team was renamed Interwetten Racing. Lüthi finished the season in fourth place in the inaugural Moto2 campaign, riding a Honda-powered Moriwaki chassis. The Interwetten team also fielded a bike in the MotoGP class for the first time with former 250cc world champion Hiroshi Aoyama finishing in 15th place aboard a Honda RC212V. Interwetten rider Marcel Schrötter finished 18th in the 125cc class on a Honda RS125R.

Between  and  the Interwetten Paddock team fielded a Suter bike for Thomas Lüthi in the Moto2 class. Since  the team expanded its activities to the Moto3 class with a Kalex-KTM bike for Philipp Öttl.

For  the Paddock team was acquired by the Technomag team and its base was relocated in France on the CGBM Evolution premises, near the Paul Ricard Circuit.

Results

Summary

Notes

References

External links 
 Interwetten Racing
 Paddock - Grand Prix team management

Motorcycle racing teams
Motorcycle racing teams established in 2002
2002 establishments in Switzerland
Motorcycle racing teams disestablished in 2014
2014 disestablishments in Switzerland